The Challenge: Final Reckoning is the thirty-second season of the MTV reality competition series The Challenge. This season featured alumni from The Real World, Road Rules, The Challenge, Are You the One?, the U.S. version of Big Brother, and the U.K. television shows Ex on the Beach and Geordie Shore, competing along with, for the first time, alumni from Bad Girls Club and Vanderpump Rules who appeared on the U.S. version of Ex on the Beach. The season premiered on July 10, 2018 on MTV.

Contestants

Teams

Format
Contestants are competing in pairs with someone they have a vendetta against (i.e. a rival or ex), who are unknown to them until they successfully survive the Opening Challenge. The elements of the game are as follows:

Daily Missions: Each round, the pairs compete in a challenge. The winning team is immune from elimination and has the "Power Vote" in the Reckoning Vote.
Reckoning Vote: Following the Daily Mission, teams have to secretly vote one of the losing pairs for the Elimination Round. The "Power Vote" counts as two votes, but may only be cast on one team. 
Elimination Rounds (Armageddon): At the "Armageddon", the results of the Reckoning Vote are revealed to the players. In the event of a tied vote, the pair holding the "Power Vote" hold the tie-breaking vote (but should they not be able to reach a decision, then they become the nominated pair). The teams who voted for the nominated team are also revealed, and the nominated team has to call-out a non-immune team who voted for them. The two teams then face each other in the Armageddon. The losing pair is eliminated, while the winners stay in the game.

In the end, the Final Four teams compete in the Final Challenge and compete for $1,000,000, with the winning team taking it all. Unbeknownst to the contestants until the final challenge, the person who accrues a faster time during aspects of the final challenge that are individually timed has a choice between keeping all the money to themselves or sharing it with their partner.

 Twists
Redemption House: Similar to XXX: Dirty 30, the "Redemption House" gives eliminated teams a chance to re-enter the main game. Periodically, the teams in Redemption House participate in a Double Cross Draw. The team who picked the XX Card will challenge a fellow Redemption pair to an "Apocalypse Challenge", while the teams not picked are officially eliminated from the game and are sent home. The winning team from the "Apocalypse Challenge" returns to the main game, while the losing team stays in "Redemption House", awaiting the next Draw & Challenge. 
Purges: Some challenges are designated as Purges, where the losing team is immediately eliminated, while the winning team gains an advantage for the next Daily Mission.
Mercenaries: For some of the Elimination Rounds, the Nominated pairs have to face a Mercenary team - late entrants into the game who compete to earn their spot in the game.

Gameplay

Challenge games
 Opening Challenge: Half the cast is buried underground in caskets in a graveyard, and their partners have to dig them out. The partners who are above ground have to use walkie-talkies and the voices of their below-ground partners are disguised, so the digging partner is not sure who their partner is until they are unburied. The buried teammate must instruct their teammate where they are located in the graveyard. The last two teams to dig their partner out are automatically eliminated, while the winning team has to eliminate one additional team.
 Winners: Amanda & Zach
 Sent to Redemption: Britni & Chuck, Jemmye & Jenna, Da'Vonne & Jozea
 Wreck Yourself: The competitors' teams are split into two roles: one being a Pusher, and one being the Swinger. The contestants are harnessed on top of a circular platform suspended in midair. The Pusher must push the Swinger off the platform for them to collect rings hanging in the middle of the platform, which they then must hand back to the Pusher. The team that collects the most rings in the shortest amount of time wins.
 Winners: Brad & Kyle
 Shark Bait: This is a purge challenge where large replicas of steaks with climbing holds, and ropes, are hung over water about 40 feet. Teams must jump from the platform onto the steaks, and from the steaks to ropes, alternating until they get to the other side of the platform. If one of the teammates falls, they are both disqualified and their score only counts how far they made it. The team that gets both members to the other side the fastest wins, and the team that falls soonest is sent straight to Redemption.
 Winners: Brad & Kyle
 Sent to Redemption: CT & Veronica
 Off The Rails: Teams must go in rounds finishing an obstacle course on top of a moving train. First, they must cross the balance beam, by using each other to balance and walk across the single beam. Next, they must walk across a tightrope each while balancing on each other, using lifelines to grab onto as well. If one teammate falls, they both lose. The team to successfully complete the obstacle course the fastest wins.
 Winners: Amanda & Zach
 Dig Deep: The paired teams are separated into two large groups randomly. The two groups are then put into mine shafts, and must solve 3 puzzles before being able to dig themselves out and race to the finish line. The first paired team to finish within the large team that finishes first, wins. 
 Winners: Kam & Kayleigh
 Don't Push Me Around: The paired teams are separated into two large teams and must play a game of rugby. The girls may only take girls and guys may only tackle guys on the opposing team. Players must retrieve the ball from their opponents end zone, and fight through an obstacle course in order to return it to their own end zone and score a point. The first team to score two points wins, and they then select the pair within the team that was the MVP. 
 Winners: Amanda & Zach
 Dunking for Dinner: This challenge is played in two phases. The first phase, one member of the team must be dunked into water by a crane with their arms tied, while the other player controls the crane. Players must move disks from one circle to the other in an allotted amount of time. The number of disks transferred corresponds to the number of dishes the team is allowed to eat. In the second phase, the player that controlled the crane now must eat as many dishes as possible. The team that eats the most dishes in 15 minutes wins, while the team that eats the least is purged straight to Redemption.
 Winners: Ashley & Hunter
 Sent to Redemption: Kam & Kayleigh
 Sky Bridge: Teams are lifted into the sky via a giant crane. There is a partially completed bridge that they must complete and crawl over by passing rope from side to side and tying knots. The team to complete their bridge and make it to the other side fastest wins.
 Winners: Bananas & Tony
 Caged In: One player will be inside of a cage and the other on the outside. When TJ says go, the players who are outside of the cage must run to a tree line, pick up a tool, and cut down branches. Players will bring the branches back and throw the branches inside the cage. The person inside the cage must use twine and the branches to make a makeshift pole tall enough to reach the keys to the cage. Once unlocked, the teams must run across a field and solve a puzzle. The first team that solves the puzzle wins. The last place team will get a significant disadvantage at the next challenge.
 Winners: Amanda & Zach
 What Goes Up, Must Come Down: Teams must race up flights of stairs to the roof of a 200-foot tower.  At the top, one member will be suspended on the side of the tower and look down at the answer key to a puzzle. They must communicate to their partner how to assemble the puzzle. Once the puzzle has been correctly assembled,  both players must repel down the tower to the ground. The team with the fastest time wins. For finishing last in the "Caged In" challenge, Cara Maria & Marie had to find the correct key from a key-chain to unlock the gates to the tower before proceeding, while the gate began unlocked for all other teams. Winners: Bananas & Tony Hit List:   Teams begin on the edge of a plank suspended above water.  One at a time, teams will be asked a trivia question regarding The Challenge trilogy. If they answer correctly, they can assign a strike to another team while answering incorrectly earns their own team a strike. Once a team earns three strikes, a battering ram will knock them into the water. The last team remaining wins.
 Winners: Natalie & Paulie Heads Will Roll: Teams begin on opposite platforms above ground. In between the two platforms is a rotating log which players must run over while carrying a flag to transfer the flag to their teammate. The team with the most flags transferred wins, while the team that transfers the least flags is purged straight to Redemption. In the event that multiple teams are unable to collect flags,  the losing team is determined based on distance travelled across the log.
 Winners: Natalie & Paulie Sent to Redemption: Nelson & Shane Rolling Thunder:  Each team has a giant boulder which they must roll to the finish line.  Halfway through the course, there is a ditch where teams have two routes they can choose from. The first team to reach the finish line wins, while the last team to reach the finish line is eliminated.
 Winners: Joss & Sylvia Eliminated: Kam & Kayleigh Painfully Wrong: All teams begin at the start of five zones, in between each zone is a 7000-volt copper curtain. One at a time, teams will be asked a trivia question. If they answer correctly, they can force another team to advance through the copper curtain to the next zone. Once a team reaches the fifth and final zone, they are out of the challenge. The last team remaining wins. 
 Winners: Joss & SylviaArmageddon games
 Think Outside the Box: One teammate is tethered to the center of the arena and attached to a resistance band while the other is inside a cage with a hole in the ceiling. The tethered teammate must run and retrieve large puzzle pieces that fit together to form a cube and give them to their teammate in the cage. The teammate in the cage must assemble the puzzle in order to climb out of the cage. The first team to successfully have their teammate escape the cage wins.
 Played By: Natalie & Paulie vs. Kam & Kayleigh Ramp It Up: Each team starts on separate ramps. Each player must race up their opponents ramp to collect a single ball. Once collecting a ball they must race back to the top of their ramp and deposit the ball into a cylinder tube. The first team to collect 7 balls will win, while the other team is sent to Redemption.
 Played By: Derrick & Tori vs. Joss & Sylvia No Slack: Teams will be tethered together in a box, separated by three walls each. Each player must smash through a plaster hole in each wall until both players are able to escape through the six walls. The first team to break through the six walls and escape the box wins.
Played by: Angela & Faith vs. Ashley & Hunter Think Tank: Similar to "Water Torture" from Battle of the Seasons (2012), one player will be hanging from a rope system by their ankles over a water tank where a puzzle key is located at the bottom. The other player will be climbing a ladder to give their partner enough slack to dive underwater and read the puzzle key which they will then relay to the climber to solve a complicated puzzle. The first team to complete the puzzle wins. If neither team is able to complete the puzzle in the allotted time, whichever team has the most correct answers would win.
Played by: Da'Vonne & Jozea vs. Kam & Kayleigh Tread Lightly: Players have to balance a ball between two sticks, then run across a stage with two treadmills going in opposite directions, and deposit their ball into a bin. The first team to deposit ten balls into their bin wins.
Played by: Nelson & Shane vs. Brad & Kyle Shake It Off: Both teams must shake off medallions hanging from a rope by jumping off a platform, grabbing the rope, and letting it go so that it shakes until all the medallions are off. The first team to shake off all nine medallions from their rope wins.
Played by: Amanda & Zach vs. Cory & Devin, Da'Vonne & Jozea vs. Cory & Devin Meet Me Halfway: Both players on each team will start at opposite ends of a maze. Carrying a key to a lock, each player must crash through dry walls in the maze until the reach the center where they then must unlock a box, retrieve the contents and ring their nearest team bell. The first team to ring their bell with the contents of their box wins.
Played by: Cara Maria & Marie vs. Nelson & Shane Don't Trip Me Up: One member of the team must dive under a water tank to untie tiles so that both team members can build a house of cards on a floating platform to a designated marker. The first team to build their tower wins.
Played by: Bananas & Tony vs. Joss & Sylvia Milk and Cookies: One team member would stand on a perch, both arms above their head with their wrists tethered to a bucket of mursik milk. The other team member would be eating cookies and Mursik milk. If the player on the perch falls off, their partner must stop eating cookies. If both team members eating finish their cookies and milk, then the elimination comes down to the perched players in a battle of endurance. The first team to either eat the most cookies or stand on the perch the longest, wins.
Played by: Bananas & Tony vs. Natalie & PaulieApocalypse (Redemption) games
Balls to the Wall: Similar to the elimination of the same name in XXX: Dirty 30, players are placed in separate cages with a sludge hammer for each partner sticking out of the walls. Each teammate must break the sledgehammer through the wall before proceeding to break a block of ice that blocks their escape. The first team to successfully escape the cage by breaking the ice wins.
 Played By: Da'Vonne & Jozea vs. Natalie & PauliePyramid Schemers: One team tries to solve two same-colored puzzles on a rotating pyramid in under three minutes. After three minutes, the next team tries to solve their respective puzzle. The first team to finish both of their puzzles first wins. If the first team completes their puzzle, the second team has a limited amount of time to complete their puzzle or they lose.
 Played By: Da'Vonne & Jozea vs. Natalie & Paulie That's The Ticket: One player is stationed in a giant sphere filled with numbered, multi-colored balls. Their goal is to collect their team's five numbers while the partner from the opposing team rotates a crank that spins the wheel. Whoever deposits the correct five balls first wins.
 Played By: Cara Maria & Marie vs. Kam & Kayleigh, Brad & Kyle vs. Natalie & Paulie I Got You Pegged: Both teams must place 16 numbered pegs on their respective climbing wall, with one person climbing and the other distributing the pegs. The numbers on the blue pegs are additioned to the total and the numbers on the red pegs are subtracted from the total, the goal is reaching the number 32. The first team to have the right answer and ring the bell wins.
 Played By: Brad & Kyle vs. Kam & Kayleigh King of the Ring: Both teams start on one end of a battering ram. On go, the teams must push, pull, or drag the other team to get them out of the ring to gain one point. The first team that gets 3 points wins.
 Played By: Bananas & Tony vs. Nelson & ShaneFinal Challenge
Prior to the final challenge, it is announced that the top player from the winning team would make the ultimate decision whether to keep the one million dollars for themselves or split the money with their partner. Each team also receives a grenade which they can use against another team, penalising them with a disadvantage during any checkpoint during the final. The final starts with players climbing out of a helicopter, down a ladder to the ground. Players must then complete a series of timed checkpoints before the results will ultimately be revealed.

 Checkpoints
Vengeance Run: Players complete a four-kilometre run down a flat road.
Final Stand: Pairs stand on together on top of a tower with a narrow foothold. The first, second and third teams to fall off receive a ten, five and two-and-a-half-minute time penalty respectively added to their pair's total time. The last team to fall off receives no time penalty.
Grenade: Both members must wear weighted vests while completing the checkpoint. (Unused)Breakfast of Champions: Pairs must eat 32 plates of food containing delicacies from countries visited during the Challenge trilogy. The first team to eat all 32 plates wins the checkpoint and have their time stopped. Each remaining plate not consumed from the other three teams counts as a one-minute penalty towards that team. 
Grenade: Both members must drink one "Amasi Fish Milkshake" before proceeding with the checkpoint. (Used by Ashley & Hunter on Joss & Sylvia)Savana Sprint: Players complete a three-kilometre run through the jungle to the Sudwala Caves.
Grenade: Pairs are given a ten-minute time penalty added to their total time. (Used by Joss & Sylvia on Ashley & Hunter)Final Reckoning: Players must walk over burning coals to reach the finish line.
Grenade: Both team members begin with their ankles chained and locked. They must unlock themselves by finding a key on a key-chain with 32 keys on it before proceeding. (Used by Natalie & Paulie on Joss & Sylvia) Results
Winners: Ashley & Hunter (69 minutes 3 seconds)(Ashley was the top performing individual player between her and Hunter and thus she was awarded the 'Million Dollar Dilemma'. She chose to take the $1,000,000 prize all for herself, leaving Hunter with nothing)''
Runners-up: Joss & Sylvia (69 minutes 43 seconds)
Third place: Natalie & Paulie (71 minutes 33 seconds)
Fourth place: Cara Maria & Marie (104 minutes 28 seconds)

Game summary

Elimination chart

Game progress 

Competition
 The team won the final challenge
 The team did not win the final challenge and did not receive any money
 The team won the challenge and was immune from the Armageddon
 The team won the challenge and an advantage for the next challenge
 The team did not nominate the team voted into the Armageddon and was not eligible to be picked for the Armageddon
 The team was eligible to be picked for the Armageddon, but was not selected
 The team won in the Armageddon
 The Mercenaries won Armageddon and entered the game
 The team lost in the Armageddon and was eliminated
 The team won the challenge, but could not decide their vote and was automatically sent to the Armageddon, and lost
 The team was eliminated at the challenge site
 The team was disqualified from the competition due to disciplinary reasons

Teams

Redemption house

Redemption chart

Redemption progress

Competition
 The team won the Redemption elimination, and returned to the main game
 The team pulled the XX card and chose their opponent for the Apocalypse
 The team was selected by the XX Holder and competed in the Apocalypse
 The team lost the Redemption elimination, and remained in the Redemption House
 The team lost the Redemption competition, and was permanently eliminated from the competition
 The team was not picked in the Double Cross and was permanently eliminated from the competition
 A contestant was removed from the competition due to injury, so his/her partner was also eliminated

Voting progress

Bold indicates the winner of that week's challenge, earning them the Power Vote, so their vote against a team counts twice.

Episodes

Reunion special
The two-part reunion special aired on November 27 and December 4, 2018, and was hosted by WWE pro wrestler, Dolph Ziggler. Cast members (including Britni, Kayleigh and Kyle via Satellite) attended at the MTV Studios in New York City.

Notes

References

External links
 

2018 American television seasons
Final Reckoning, The Challenge
Television shows set in South Africa
Television shows filmed in South Africa